The ordinary chondrites (sometimes called the O chondrites) are a class of stony chondritic meteorites. They are by far the most numerous group, comprising 87% of all finds. Hence, they have been dubbed "ordinary". The ordinary chondrites are thought to have originated from three parent asteroids, with the fragments making up the H chondrite, L chondrite and LL chondrite groups respectively.

Origin
It is suspected that they are not representative of typical asteroid parent bodies, but rather of a select few which are advantageously placed to send impact fragments to Earth-crossing orbits. Such positions are e.g. 
near Kirkwood gaps and/or secular resonances in the main asteroid belt. In fact, only the one rather insignificant asteroid 3628 Božněmcová has been identified to have a spectrum close to the ordinary chondrites.

A probable parent body of the H chondrites (comprising about 46% of the ordinary chondrites) is 6 Hebe, but its spectrum is dissimilar due to what is likely a metal impact melt component.

It is likely that the ordinary chondrites comprise a detailed sample of but a few select asteroids which happen to have been in the right place at the right time to send many fragments toward Earth at the present moment in solar system history. On the other hand, observations of 243 Ida by the Galileo spacecraft found weathering of Ida's surface, and the reflection spectra of freshly exposed parts of the surface resembled that of OC meteorites, while the older regions matched the spectra of common S-type asteroids.

Chemical composition
The ordinary chondrites comprise three mineralogically and chemically distinct groupings. They differ in the amount of total iron, of iron metal and iron oxide in the silicates:
 The H chondrites have the Highest total iron, high metal, but lower iron oxide (Fa) in the silicates
 The L chondrites have Lower total iron, lower metal, but higher iron oxide (Fa) in the silicates
 The LL chondrites have Low total iron and Low metal, but the highest iron oxide content (Fa) in the silicates

See also
 Glossary of meteoritics
 Chondrite
 Chondrule

References

External links

The Catalogue of Meteorites
 A Pictorial of Ordinary Chondrites - Meteorites Australia
Gallery of Ordinary Chondrites by James St. John, a geologist  at Ohio State University

it:Condrite#Condriti ordinarie